Majac is a village located in the Municipality of Podujevo, District of Pristina, Kosovo.

Notes

References

Villages in Podujevo